Antonio Israel Blake Cantero (born 9 May 1967) is a Cuban football manager and retired player for the Cuba national team.

Playing career

International
As a player, he made his international debut for Cuba in an October 1997 friendly match against St Kitts and Nevis and represented his country at the 1998 CONCACAF Gold Cup.

Managerial career
Blake was coach of the Cuba U-17 's during the 2011 CONCACAF Under-17 Championship and was named manager of the senior Haiti national football team in 2012, but was dismissed after the 2013 CONCACAF Gold Cup.

References

External links
 

1967 births
Living people
People from Cienfuegos
Association football defenders
Cuban footballers
Cuba international footballers
FC Cienfuegos players
1998 CONCACAF Gold Cup players
Cuban football managers
Cuban expatriate football managers
Haiti national football team managers
Expatriate football managers in Haiti
Cuban expatriate sportspeople in Haiti